Juan Alberto Estrada (28 October 1912 – 28 May 1985) was an Argentine football goalkeeper who won two Copa América championships with the Argentina national team and two league titles with Boca Juniors.

Playing career

Club
Estrada began his career with Sportivo Palermo, in 1933 he joined Huracán where he made 102 league appearances for the club before his transfer to Boca Juniors at the end of the 1937 season.

Estrada made his debut for Boca on 3 April 1938 in a 1–1 away draw with Ferro Carril Oeste. He went on to win two league championships with the club in 1940 and 1943. He made a total of 142 appearances for the club in all competitions before his departure in October 1943.

Estrada ended his playing career in Uruguay playing for Defensor. During the 1944 season he made a club record five penalty saves.

International
Estrada made 18 appearances for the Argentina national team between 1936 and 1941. He played in two editions of Copa América. He was on the winning team in 1937 in Argentina and again in 1941 in Chile.

Honours
Boca Juniors
 Primera División: 1940, 1943

Argentina national team
 Copa América: 1937, 1941

References

External links

Profile at Bocampeonweb 
Statistics at Historia de Boca 

1912 births
1985 deaths
Sportspeople from Buenos Aires Province
Argentine footballers
Argentina international footballers
Association football goalkeepers
Club Atlético Huracán footballers
Boca Juniors footballers
Defensor Sporting players
Argentine Primera División players
Argentine expatriate footballers
Expatriate footballers in Uruguay